Andover is a town in Windsor County, Vermont, United States. The population was 568 at the 2020 census.

Geography

Demographics

As of the census of 2000, there were 496 people, 215 households, and 147 families residing in the town.  The population density was 17.2 people per square mile (6.7/km2).  There were 347 housing units at an average density of 12.1 per square mile (4.7/km2).  The racial makeup of the town was 98.39% White, 0.40% Native American, 0.40% Asian, 0.20% from other races, and 0.60% from two or more races. Hispanic or Latino of any race were 0.40% of the population.

There were 215 households, out of which 22.3% had children under the age of 18 living with them, 57.7% were married couples living together, 7.4% had a female householder with no husband present, and 31.6% were non-families. 22.8% of all households were made up of individuals, and 7.4% had someone living alone who was 65 years of age or older.  The average household size was 2.31 and the average family size was 2.70.

In the town, the population was spread out, with 19.4% under the age of 18, 5.6% from 18 to 24, 25.4% from 25 to 44, 29.6% from 45 to 64, and 20.0% who were 65 years of age or older.  The median age was 45 years. For every 100 women, there were 105.8 men.  For every 100 women age 18 and over, there were 112.8 men.

The median income for a household in the town was $42,273, and the median income for a family was $50,625. Men had a median income of $26,719 versus $25,658 for women. The per capita income for the town was $21,744.  About 4.5% of families and 8.0% of the population were below the poverty line, including 9.7% of those under age 18 and 8.2% of those age 65 or over.

Notable people 

 Alvin Adams (1804–1877), founded among the first carrier companies for express shipments by rail in the United States
 Austin Adams (1826–1890), lawyer and justice of the Iowa Supreme Court
 Claudio Arrau (1903–1991), classical pianist
 George Washington Putnam (1826–1899), member of the Wisconsin State Assembly

References

External links 

 
Towns in Vermont
Towns in Windsor County, Vermont